Coptops undulata is a species of beetle in the family Cerambycidae. It was described by Francis Polkinghorne Pascoe in 1865. It is known from Malaysia and Java.

Subspecies
 Coptops undulata javanica Breuning, 1967
 Coptops undulata undulata Pascoe, 1865

References

undulata
Beetles described in 1865